Eoophyla quadriplagiata is a moth in the family Crambidae. It was described by George Hampson in 1917. It is found on the D'Entrecasteaux Islands and Goodenough Island.

References

Eoophyla
Moths described in 1917